{
  "type": "FeatureCollection",
  "features": [
    {
      "type": "Feature",
      "properties": {},
      "geometry": {
        "type": "Point",
        "coordinates": [
          74.015694,
          17.582394
        ]
      }
    }
  ]
}

Tirthkshetra Padali (Ninam) is a village located in the Satara (Tehsil & District) of Maharashtra state of India. Tirthkshetra Padali village is surrounded by Urmodi river. The village is near the historic Ajinkyatara fort, which is situated on the north side of Tirthkshetra Padali.

Festival (YATRA) 

Tirthkshetra Padali yatra fall in Month of April on Sankashti Chaturthi mostly 3-4 day after Jyotirlinga chaitra yatra Kolhapur. 

As per tradition, every Sasan Kathi is ranked from 1 to 108 and out of 108, nearly 40 - 50 Sasan Kathi's are arrived in Jyotiba temple for Chaitra Yatra in Wadi Ratnagiri. The first rank of the Sasan Kathi has been given to Tirthkshetra Padali village. 

Sasan Kathi's are the biggest attraction of the Yatra. On the day of yatra, when all sasan kathi's arrived at the temple, proper invitation awarded to Tirthkshetra Padali village via Bhaldar from Paschim Maharashtra Devasthan Samiti (PMDS). 

Villages in Satara district

Education 
Primary School

ZILLA PARISHAD MARATHI SCHOOL

High School

ENGLISH SCHOOL AND TANAJI BANDU DHANE JUNIOR COLLEGE OF ARTS PADALI NINAM

Sports 
Cricket

 Divyashakti Cricket club Padali

Nearest Tourism 
 Ajinkyatara
 Kas Plateau Reserved Forest
 Mahabaleshwar
 Sajjangad
 Pratapgad

Villages in Satara district